Kharaju (also Romanized as Kharājū and Khodajū) is a city in Saraju District of Maragheh County, East Azerbaijan province, Iran. At the 2006 census, its population was 1,458 in 361 households. The following census in 2011 counted 1,584 people in 430 households. The latest census in 2016 showed a population of 1,824 people in 572 households.

References 

Maragheh County

Cities in East Azerbaijan Province

Populated places in East Azerbaijan Province

Populated places in Maragheh County